The 2004 Pepsi 400 was the 17th race of the 2004 NASCAR Nextel Cup Series season. It was held on July 3, 2004 at Daytona International Speedway in Daytona Beach, Florida. Jeff Gordon of Hendrick Motorsports won the race from the pole position and also led the most laps.

Race
The race was delayed for two hours due to rain. Former Jacksonville Jaguars quarterback Byron Leftwich was the grand marshal for the race; NBA All-Star Tracy McGrady was originally the grand marshal but was replaced by Leftwich due to scheduling conflicts.

Ten laps into the race, Michael Waltrip passed pole-sitter, Jeff Gordon, for the lead. On Lap 19, the caution flag was thrown after a multi-car accident. Waltrip continued leading until Lap 55, in which Dale Earnhardt Incorporated teammate Dale Earnhardt Jr. After Bobby Hamilton Jr. had an accident on Lap 70, Earnhardt led the race into pit road, but was pushed out by Gordon and Brian Vickers, and fell to fifteenth, giving Mike Wallace the lead entering Lap 74. Shepherd pitted on the following lap, and Morgan Shepherd took the lead. However, Shepherd would later pit, as Gordon regained the lead. Waltrip then retook the lead from Gordon on Lap 86, though Gordon then took the lead again 13 laps later. Ten laps later, Gordon pitted, and Waltrip was given the lead. On the ensuing lap, Earnhardt took the lead, though he later pitted, and Jimmy Spencer gained the lead. On Lap 113, Spencer lost the lead to Gordon when he pitted, who led the pit stops on Lap 139. Dave Blaney stayed out, and took the lead, though Ryan Newman gained first-place when Blaney went to pit road. Newman pitted on Lap 143, giving Tony Stewart the lead. With ten laps left in the race, Hendrick Motorsports teammates Jeff Gordon and Jimmie Johnson followed in third and fourth, respectively, behind Tony Stewart and Dale Earnhardt Jr. Johnson then pushed Gordon past Stewart and Earnhardt, and Gordon subsequently won, his fourth of the season and second consecutive. The victory by Gordon made him the first driver since Cale Yarborough to win the Pepsi 400 from the pole. A version of the race's waning moments was included in the prologue of the video game NASCAR 06: Total Team Control, which involved Johnson pushing Gordon past Earnhardt.

Notably, Pepsi's rival Coca-Cola heavily promoted their new brand Coca-Cola C2 throughout the pre-race activities, and sponsored eight cars: the #1 driven by John Andretti, the #16 driven by Greg Biffle, the #20 driven by Tony Stewart, the #21 driven by Ricky Rudd, the #29 driven by Kevin Harvick, the #97 driven by Kurt Busch, the #98 driven by Bill Elliott, and the #99 driven by Jeff Burton.  Ironically, despite this act of "ambush marketing", the Pepsi-sponsored Gordon won the race.

Race results
Source:

 Jeff Gordon
 Jimmie Johnson
 Dale Earnhardt Jr.
 Kurt Busch
 Tony Stewart
 Mark Martin
 Bobby Labonte
 Terry Labonte
 Brian Vickers
 Joe Nemechek
 Casey Mears
 Ryan Newman
 Michael Waltrip
 Kevin Harvick
 Dave Blaney
 Dale Jarrett
 Ricky Rudd
 Bill Elliott
 Robby Gordon
 Sterling Marlin
 Scott Riggs
 Jeremy Mayfield
 Jeff Burton
 Kyle Petty
 Kasey Kahne
 Elliott Sadler
 Rusty Wallace
 Kerry Earnhardt
 Jimmy Spencer
 Jeff Green
 Greg Biffle
 Scott Wimmer
 Morgan Shepherd
 Larry Gunselman
 Ken Schrader
 Brendan Gaughan
 Jamie McMurray
 Ricky Craven
 Matt Kenseth
 Ward Burton
 Mike Wallace
 Bobby Hamilton Jr.
 John Andretti

Did not qualify
 Chad Blount
 Tony Raines
 Derrike Cope
 Eric McClure
 Kenny Wallace   
 Kirk Shelmerdine

Standings after the race

References

Pepsi 400
Pepsi 400
NASCAR races at Daytona International Speedway